EXMAR Ship Management is a Belgian maritime company. It was established in 1991 from the shipping activities of the CMB group, Compagnie Maritime Belge, established in 1895 as a diversifie shipping group with headquarters in Antwerp, Belgium.
When the CMB shareholders decided on the de-merger of the company by spinning off its Gas Transport Business into a new Belgian listed public limited liability company, EXMAR Shipmanagement NV became a 100% affiliate of Exmar NV.

Services 
The ship management company of the EXMAR Group offers ship management services to the maritime industry. These services include:
Crewing services: ESM employs 387 Senior Officers, 598 Junior Officers, 700 A/B seamen and 127 Offshore employees to operate LNG and LNGRV carriers, LPG carriers, Floating Storage and Regasification Units, Floating Liquefaction Units and Offshore Accommodation Barges. Company activities include : 
Technical Superintendence & HSEQ management
Technical, marine & IT consultancy services:
 Pre-purchase inspections, building supervision & commissioning of vessels under construction
 HSEQ management: implementation, maintenance, training and audits
 Port Facility Security management: assessment of security threats, security plans, training & drills, audits
 IT: implementation of on board planned maintenance systems.

EXMAR Ship Management specialises in managing the following vessel/barge types :
 VLGC LPG carriers
 Midsize LPG carriers
 LNG and LNGRV carriers 
 Fully pressurized LPG carriers
 Semi-pressurized Gas carriers
 Floating Storage & Regasification Units
 Offshore units (FPSOs, accommodation barges)
 Floating Liquefaction Units

Overview
EXMAR Ship Management has been involved in the management of LNG and LPG vessels since the early 1980s, as the primary ship manager of EXMAR NV, as well as other owners such as Avance. Exmar NV is supervising an LPG carrier new building programme and a refit of its LNG fleet to accommodate Regas operations on a number of its LNG Gas Carriers. EXMAR Ship Management Superintendents are typically former serving Officers who manage vessels from NB spec review to full operations. Similarly, the experience gained in assisting the owner during pre-delivery and the first months of operation (first outfit, guarantee items, etc.) are utilised for the subsequent technical superintendence of the vessel. The company's Marine Department manages all aspects of vessel conformance with the relevant ISO, OHSAS and TMSA standards.
Training programs have been set up with the Antwerp Maritime Academy and other Institutes for in-depth training with the STCW and ARPA, BRM, GMDSS and full mission Bridge simulators.

LNG cargo 

The LNG fleet managed by EXMAR Ship Management is as follows:

FSRU

The FRSU Toscana is co-managed and operated by EXMAR Ship Managagement and Fratelli Cosulich through the joint venture EXMAR Cosulich Offshore Services

LPG/NH3 cargo 

EXMAR Ship Management currently manages and operates the following VLGC’s, midsize, semi-refrigerated and fully pressurised gas carriers :

Offshore 
EXMAR Ship Management is responsible for the technical operations of the following four offshore units:
 Farwah: ,  storage FPSO
 Kissama: Offshore service non-propelled accommodation barge for 220 people
 Nunce: Offshore service non-propelled accommodation barge for 350/450 people
 Otto 5: Offshore service non-propelled accommodation barge for 300 people

In addition to servicing owned tonnage, Exmar (Exmar Offshore Services) provides operational support to third party FPSO projects in West & North Africa and Italy.

References

Company brochure EXMAR Ship Management, De Gerlachekaai 20, 2000 Antwerp
Company website
Ship to Shore Internal magazine
Internal Vessel Information Portal
Excelerate Energy Website
Teekay LNG Partners Website

Shipping companies of Belgium
Gas shipping companies